Boro Bosić (born 17 June 1950) is a Bosnian Serb politician who served as the Co-Chairman of the Council of Ministers of Bosnia and Herzegovina from 3 January 1997 until 3 February 1999.

He also served as the first Minister of Industry and Energy of Republika Srpska from 20 January 1993 to 17 December 1995.

References

1950 births
Living people
People from Šamac, Bosnia and Herzegovina
Serbs of Bosnia and Herzegovina
Politicians of Republika Srpska
Serb Democratic Party (Bosnia and Herzegovina) politicians